Thendral Sudum is a 1989 Indian Tamil-language film directed by Manobala and written by M. Karunanidhi, starring Nizhalgal Ravi and Raadhika. It is a remake of the Hindi film Khoon Bhari Maang (1988), itself loosely based on the Australian miniseries Return to Eden (1983). The film revolves around a woman seeking revenge on her husband after surviving an attempt made by him on her life. It was released on 10 March 1989.

Plot 

Kala, a docile woman, is pushed into a crocodile's jaws by her husband Anand during their honeymoon. Having survived the attempt on her life, she undergoes plastic surgery and seeks revenge on Anand.

Cast 
Nizhalgal Ravi as Anand
Raadhika as Kala

Soundtrack 
The soundtrack was composed by Ilaiyaraaja. His son Yuvan Shankar Raja debuted as a playback singer with this film.

Release and reception 
Thendral Sudum was released on 10 March 1989. N. Krishnaswamy of The Indian Express wrote, "Thendral Sudum despite the familiar theme manages to keep alive viewer interest because of neat characterisation [..] and good acting". P. S. S. of Kalki praised the performances of Radhika, Nizhalgal Ravi and Lokanath's cinematography, he also praised the dialogues of Karunanidhi by updating himself for today's times but felt the dialogues he had written for the emotional sequences were old-fashioned, similar to Parasakthi.

References

External links 

1980s Tamil-language films
1989 films
Films directed by Manobala
Films scored by Ilaiyaraaja
Films with screenplays by M. Karunanidhi
Indian films about revenge
Tamil remakes of Hindi films